Bob Carpenter (born March 4, 1953) is an American sportscaster and current television play-by-play announcer for Major League Baseball's Washington Nationals on MASN. He was born in St. Louis, Missouri, and graduated from William Cullen McBride High School. Carpenter attended the University of Missouri-St. Louis, and later graduated with honors from the University of Missouri-Kansas City with a bachelor's degree in Radio-TV-Film.

Biography
Carpenter has been the Washington Nationals TV broadcaster since 2006.

Carpenter served two stints calling television broadcasts for the St. Louis Cardinals, and also spent 16 seasons as a baseball announcer with ESPN, 18 seasons overall with the network, also covering soccer, college baseball, basketball and football and minor league baseball in addition to the major leagues. He also served as a team broadcaster for the New York Mets, Minnesota Twins and Texas Rangers.

From 1978 until 1984, Carpenter called soccer games for the Tulsa Roughnecks of the North American Soccer League and the St. Louis Steamers of the Major Indoor Soccer League.  He announced 2 World Cups for ESPN; 1982 with Bob Ley and 1994 (10 games) with Seamus Malin and Clive Charles.

In his first major league season, 1984, Carpenter developed his own baseball scorebook.  He started marketing it in 1995, and "Bob Carpenter's Scorebook" is now used by many college, major and minor league announcers.  It is the most widely used scorebook in the nation by fans and broadcasters.

He also called NCAA Basketball on CBS as well as college football and basketball games for USA Sports and Major League Baseball for NBC. In addition to baseball and college sports, Carpenter called tennis (1995 U.S. Open) and golf (Masters 1986–1988) for USA Network.  Carpenter called 6 NCAA basketball tournaments for ESPN and CBS, plus the 2005 Final Four in St. Louis for NCAA International.

Carpenter is a two-time St. Louis-area Emmy Award winner for his coverage of the Cardinals, and has been nominated for 6 Emmys overall; 1 in New York (Mets '92, Outstanding Sports Coverage ), 4 in St. Louis and 1 in the Washington/Baltimore region (Nationals '08, Sports Play-by-Play ).  Carpenter was named the 2014 Washington, DC Sportscaster of the Year (along with Washington Capitals TV voice Joe Beninati) by the National Sportswriters and Sportscasters Association.  He has called 6 no-hitters:  Montreal's David Palmer in 1984, a rain-shortened 5-inning perfect game at St. Louis; Cardinals rookie Jose Jimenez at Arizona in 1999 and rookie Bud Smith at San Diego in 2001 (the 2 most recent St. Louis no-hitters), Washington's Jordan Zimmermann versus Miami at Nationals Park on the last day of the 2014 season, Washington's Max Scherzer over Pittsburgh at Nationals Park on June 20, 2015, and Scherzer's second 2015 no-hitter at New York versus the Mets October 3.  With ESPN, St. Louis and Washington, Carpenter has called numerous division clinchers, and announced the 1996 NLCS for St. Louis on KMOX Radio.

Carpenter called TV play-by-play for University of Oklahoma men's and women's basketball for 16 years, retiring from hoops in February 2017. He also covered Oral Roberts University basketball games in the baseball off-season.
In March 2017, Carpenter was inducted into the Oklahoma Association of Broadcasters Hall of Fame.

Trademarks
 See ... you ... later! after a home run is hit by the Nationals. ... Carpenter also uses the phrase when signing off after a Nationals win.
 So long ... for just a while at signoff after a Nationals loss, a tribute to Jack Buck with whom Carpenter shared the St. Louis TV booth in 1984, his rookie season as a Major League Baseball broadcaster.

See also
 List of Washington Nationals broadcasters

References

1953 births
Living people
American soccer commentators
American television sports announcers
College basketball announcers in the United States
College football announcers
Golf writers and broadcasters
Major Indoor Soccer League (1978–1992) commentators
Major League Baseball broadcasters
Mid-Atlantic Sports Network
Minnesota Twins announcers
Minor League Baseball broadcasters
New York Mets announcers
North American Soccer League (1968–1984) commentators
Sportspeople from St. Louis
St. Louis Cardinals announcers
Tennis commentators
Texas Rangers (baseball) announcers
University of Missouri–Kansas City alumni
Washington Nationals announcers
Women's college basketball announcers in the United States